Bjørnevatn is a village in Sør-Varanger Municipality in Troms og Finnmark county, Norway. The village has a couple of suburbs including Hesseng to the north and Sandnes to the west. The Bjørnevatn IL is the local sports team.

Mine
Iron ore deposits were originally discovered in the area during 1868 with commercial production of iron ore by 1910. The Sydvaranger iron ore mines are located just south of Bjørnevatn. The Kirkenes–Bjørnevatn Line is a short railway line that runs from the mines to the town and port at Kirkenes to the north.

History
The village used to be located near the shores of the lake Bjørnevatnet, but the lake was drained in 1958 so that the iron ore under the lake could be mined.
During the liberation in 1944 at the end of World War II, a large number of people lived inside the mines during the fighting; estimates vary between 1,000 and 3,500. Their story is portrayed in the 1974 film Under a Stone Sky.

References

Other sources
Henriksen, Gudbrand  (1904) On the Iron Ore Deposits in Sydvaranger, Finmarken-Norway  (Grøndahl & Søn)

External links
Sydvaranger Iron Project (Northern Iron)

Villages in Finnmark
Sør-Varanger
Populated places of Arctic Norway